= 2026 Portsmouth, Virginia City Council election =

2026 Portsmouth City Council election
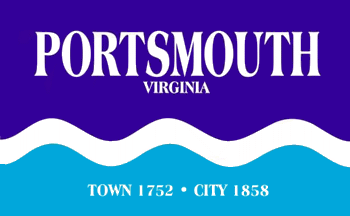
- November 3, 2026

The 2026 Portsmouth City Council election was held on November 3, 2026, to elect three members to the city council of Portsmouth, Virginia. The election was held using plurality block voting.

== Candidates ==
=== Declared ===
- Lisa Lucas-Burke, former city councilmember (2016–2024)
- Bill Moody, incumbent city councilmember (previously declined to run)
- Mark Hugel, incumbent city councilmember
- Vernon Tillage, incumbent city councilmember
- Mark Whitaker, former city councilmember

== Results ==
2026 Portsmouth, Virginia City Council election (vote for up to 3)
Candidate	Votes	%
Vernon Tillage (incumbent)	19,331	26.36
Lisa Lucas-Burke	15,564	21.22
Mark Whitaker	12,922	17.62
Bill Moody (incumbent)	12,901	17.59
Mark Hugel (incumbent)	12,222	16.67
Write-in	398	0.54
Total votes	73,338	100.00
